The 9th Annual MTV Millennial Awards took place on July 10, 2022, at the Pepsi Center WTC in Mexico City. They were broadcast live by MTV Latin America. The awards celebrated the best of Latin music and the digital world of the millennial generation. The list of nominees were revealed on June 6, 2022. The ceremony was broadcast on MTV, Paramount+, PlutoTV, Facebook and TikTok.

Performers

Winners and nominees 
Winners are listed first and highlighted in bold.

Music

Digital

Entertainment

References 

MTV
Mexican awards